Michael Fassbender is a German-Irish actor who made his screen debut in the 2001 war drama miniseries Band of Brothers as Burton Christenson. Fassbender followed this with a number of television roles including a German motorcycle courier in the drama Hearts and Bones (2001), Guy Fawkes in the miniseries Gunpowder, Treason & Plot (2004), Lt. Harry Colebourn in the film A Bear Named Winnie (2004), and Azazeal in the series Hex (2004–05). He made his film debut playing a Spartan soldier in Zack Snyder's 300 (2007). The following year Fassbender portrayed Irish republican Bobby Sands during the events of the 1981 Irish hunger strike in Steve McQueen's historical drama Hunger. His performance garnered him the Best Actor award at the British Independent Film Awards, and the Irish Film and Television Awards.

Fassbender appeared as a British soldier in Quentin Tarantino-directed film Inglourious Basterds (2009). Two years later, he played Carl Jung in David Cronenberg's A Dangerous Method, and a man suffering with sex addiction in McQueen's Shame. His performance in the latter earned him the Volpi Cup for Best Actor at the Venice Film Festival. In the same year he also appeared in superhero film X-Men: First Class as young Magneto. In 2013, Fassbender reteamed with McQueen on the period drama 12 Years a Slave. For his role as a slave owner in the film he received a nomination for the Academy Award for Best Supporting Actor. The following year, he reprised his role as Magneto in the superhero sequel X-Men: Days of Future Past which grossed a box-office total of over $747 million—his highest grossing release as of September 2019. In 2015, he appeared as the title character in Justin Kurzel's film adaptation of the play Macbeth. In the same year, Fassbender's portrayal of Steve Jobs in Danny Boyle's eponymous film garnered him a nomination for the Academy Award for Best Actor.

Film

Television

Video games

See also
List of awards and nominations received by Michael Fassbender

Notes

References

Bibliography

External links
 
 

Male actor filmographies
Irish filmographies